A Peep Behind the Scenes is a 1929 British silent drama film directed by Jack Raymond and starring Frances Cuyler, Haddon Mason and Harold Saxon-Snell. It was based on the 1877 novel of the same title by Amy Catherine Walton. It was made at Cricklewood Studios.

Cast
 Frances Cuyler as Rosalie Joyce 
 Haddon Mason as Toby Charlton 
 Harold Saxon-Snell as Augustus Joyce 
 Vera Stanton as Gypsy Belle 
 Johnny Butt as Jim 
 Renée Macready as Norah Joyce 
 Ethel Irving as Lucy Leslie 
 Clarence Blakiston as Henry Leslie 
 Shirley Whyte as Mother Manikin

References

Bibliography
 Low, Rachel. The History of British Film: Volume IV, 1918–1929. Routledge, 1997.

External links

1929 films
British drama films
British silent feature films
1929 drama films
Films directed by Jack Raymond
Films shot at Cricklewood Studios
Films based on British novels
British black-and-white films
British and Dominions Studios films
1920s English-language films
1920s British films
Silent drama films